En el Jardín del Corazón is the first album by Gandhi, a Costa Rican music group.

Track listing
"Quisieras"
"Seca roja reja"
"Mátame"
"El payaso"
"La469"
"El invisible"
"Descanso"
"Mientras tanto"
"Solo"
"El jardín"
"Del corazón"

Gandhi (Costa Rican band) albums
Spanish-language albums
1997 debut albums